Cwmbach  railway station is a railway station serving the village of Cwmbach in Rhondda Cynon Taf, Wales.  It is located on the Aberdare branch of the Merthyr Line. Passenger services are provided by Transport for Wales.

History
The first station on this site was a halt opened by the Great Western Railway in 1914. It closed with the line in 1964. The present station was reopened by British Rail with Mid Glamorgan in 1988 with the line to Aberdare.

During 2005 construction work was carried out to double the platform length. This will now allow four carriage trains (DMU) to stop at the station. DB Cargo UK operate coal trains to Tower Colliery. These trains pass through the station on weekdays and on some Saturdays. Freightliner also operate an irregular stone service to Tower and these trains also pass through the station. Most passenger services to Barry Island are operated by Class 150s. The Class 150 either work in 4-car formation or 2 car formation Freight that passes through the station is handled by Class 66s but Class 60s have been seen.

Services 
In the evening, this drops to hourly.

On Sundays there is a general 2-hourly service to Barry Island with an hourly service in the morning and in the late afternoon. This is due to a campaign by the local Assembly Member and a successful trial in December 2017. The extra services began in April 2018.

References

External links 

Railway stations in Rhondda Cynon Taf
DfT Category F2 stations
Railway stations opened by British Rail
Railway stations in Great Britain opened in 1914
Railway stations in Great Britain closed in 1964
Reopened railway stations in Great Britain
Railway stations in Great Britain opened in 1988
Railway stations served by Transport for Wales Rail